The Deputy Governor of Bali deputises for the Governor of Bali.

List 

 Tjokorda Oka Artha Ardana Sukawati

References 

Bali
Politicians from Bali
Politics of Bali